Anwarul Ashraf Khan is a Bangladesh Awami League politician and the incumbent Member of Parliament from Narsingdi-2.

Early life
Khan was born on 1 October 1956. He graduated from medical school with a MBBS and worked as a doctor.

Career
Khan was elected to Parliament in 2008 from Narsingdi-2 as a Bangladesh Awami League candidate. He served as a member of the Parliamentary Standing Committee on Ministry of Industry. He is the President of Palash upazila unit of Bangladesh Awami League. He was re-elected from Narsingdi-2 as a Bangladesh Awami League candidate on 30 December 2018.

References

Awami League politicians
Living people
1956 births
9th Jatiya Sangsad members
11th Jatiya Sangsad members